Henry Golding (died 1576), of Little Birch, Essex, was an English politician.

He was a Member (MP) of the Parliament of England for Maldon in 1558 and 1559 and for Colchester in 1571 and 1572.

References

Year of birth missing
1576 deaths
People from the Borough of Colchester
Members of Parliament for Maldon
English MPs 1558
English MPs 1559
English MPs 1571
English MPs 1572–1583